George Frederick Buchan Scott (born 6 November 1995) is an English cricketer who most recently played for Gloucestershire County Cricket Club. An all-rounder, who is a right-handed batsman, and bowls right-arm medium pace. After a schoolboy career at St Albans Boys School, Scott made his first-class debut for Leeds Bradford MCCU against Sussex County Cricket Club in April 2015.

At the end of the 2019 season, Scott turned down the offer of a new contract at Middlesex to join Gloucestershire on a three-year deal. He left Gloucestershire at the end of the 2022 season.

His brother, Charlie, has also played first-class cricket.

References

External links
 

1995 births
Living people
Sportspeople from Hemel Hempstead
English cricketers
Middlesex cricketers
Leeds/Bradford MCCU cricketers
Hertfordshire cricketers
Gloucestershire cricketers
Somerset cricketers